Alidad Saveh-Shemshaki (born 23 July 1972 in Tehran) is a retired alpine skier from Iran. He competed for Iran at the 2006 Winter Olympics. He was also Iran's Flag Bearer at the Games.

References

External links

1972 births
Living people
Iranian male alpine skiers
Olympic alpine skiers of Iran
Alpine skiers at the 2006 Winter Olympics
Alpine skiers at the 1996 Asian Winter Games
Alpine skiers at the 1999 Asian Winter Games
Alpine skiers at the 2003 Asian Winter Games
Alpine skiers at the 2007 Asian Winter Games